Jesse Ball (born June 7, 1978) is an American novelist and poet. He has published novels, volumes of poetry, short stories, and drawings. His works are distinguished by the use of a spare style and have been compared to those of Jorge Luis Borges and Italo Calvino.

Early life and education
Ball was born into a middle-class, English-speaking Irish-Sicilian family in Port Jefferson, New York, on Long Island.  Ball's father worked in Medicaid; his mother worked in libraries.  His brother, Abram, was born with Down's syndrome and attended a school some distance from the place where they lived. Ball attended Port Jefferson High School, and matriculated at Vassar College.

Following Vassar, Ball attended Columbia University, where he earned an MFA and met the poet Richard Howard. Howard helped the then 24-year-old poet publish his first volume, March Book, with Grove Press.

Career 
In 2007 and 2008, Ball published Samedi the Deafness and the novella The Early Deaths of Lubeck, Brennan, Harp & Carr.  The latter won the Paris Review'''s Plimpton Prize.  These were followed in 2009 by The Way Through Doors, and in 2011, The Curfew, whose style The New Yorker described as "[lying] at some oscillating coordinate between Kafka and Calvino: swift, intense fables composed of equal parts wonder and dread."

Ball's 2014 book Silence Once Begun was reviewed by James Wood in The New Yorker in February 2014. In 2015, he was a finalist for the NYPL Young Lion Prize (also for Silence Once Begun).  Later that year, he published A Cure for Suicide, which was long-listed for the National Book Award.

In 2017, Granta included him on their list of Best Young American Novelists. On June 30 of that year Ball published an opinion piece in the Los Angeles Times suggesting that all American citizens be incarcerated periodically, as a civic duty.  The article likens this incarceration to already existing jury duty and states that no one, not even sitting politicians, judges or military officers would be free from it.

Ball's The Divers' Game was included on The New Yorker's Best Books of 2019 list. Staff writer Katy Waldman writes, "This dystopic fable imagines a society riven in two, with the upper class empowered to murder members of the lower class, for any reason."

Ball is represented by Jim Rutman of Sterling Lord Literistic.

Personal life
In Iceland, Ball met Thordis Bjornsdottir, a poet and author who he collaborated with on two books, married, and later divorced. Ball and the writer Catherine Lacey were partners from 2016 to 2021. 

Ball has lived since 2007 in Chicago.  He is on the faculty at the School of the Art Institute of Chicago where he teaches courses on lying, ambiguity, dreaming, and walking.

Works

Poetry
 March Book. Verse. (New York, NY: Grove Press, 2004) 
 The Village on Horseback: Prose and Verse, 2003-2008 (Minneapolis: Milkweed Editions, 2011)

Novels
 Samedi the Deafness. Novel. (New York: Vintage, 2007)
 The Way Through Doors. Novel. (New York: Vintage, 2009)
 The Curfew. Novel. (New York: Vintage, 2011)
 Silence Once Begun. Novel. (New York: Pantheon, 2014)
 A Cure for Suicide. Novel.  (New York: Pantheon, 2015)
 How to Set a Fire and Why. Novel. (New York: Pantheon, 2016)
 Census. Novel. (New York: Ecco, 2018) 
 The Divers' Game. Novel. (New York: Ecco, 2019)
  The Children VI Novel. (Buenos Aires: Editorial Sigilo 2022)

Short fiction
 Vera & Linus. Stories. With Thórdís Björnsdóttir. (Reykjavík: Nyhil, 2006)
 Parables & Lies. Prose. (Lincoln, NE: The Cupboard Pamphlet, 2007). Also included in The Village on Horseback: Prose and Verse, 2003-2008. 
 Pieter Emily. Novella serialized in Guernica Magazine (2009). Also included in The Village on Horseback: Prose and Verse, 2003-2008. 
 The Lesson. Novella. (New York: Vintage, 2016)  
 Deaths of Henry King. Stories. With Brian Evenson, Lilli Carré. (New York: Uncivilized, 2017)

Nonfiction
 Notes on My Dunce Cap. Nonfiction. (Brooklyn: Pioneer Works Press, 2016) 
 Sleep, Death's Brother. Nonfiction. (Brooklyn: Pioneer Works Press, 2017) 

Memoir
 Autoportrait. Memoir. (Catapult, 2022) 

Drawings
 Og svo kom nóttin, Drawings. With Thórdís Björnsdóttir. (Reykjavík: Nyhil, 2006)

Awards

 Berlin Prize, American Academy in Berlin, 2018, for the novel, The Children Six 
 Guggenheim Fellowship, 2016
 Creative Capital Award, 2016
 Granta Best Young American Novelists 2017
 Longlisted for the 2015 National Book Awards for A Cure for SuicideThe Illinois Author of the Year for 2015: Illinois Association of Teachers of English
 National Endowment for the Arts Creative Writing Fellowship, 2014 
 The Plimpton Prize for the story The Early Deaths of Lubeck, Brennan, Harp, and Carr: Paris Review, 2008
 2018 Gordon Burn Prize for Census Notes 

References
 The New Yorker: "But He Confessed." Review of Silence Once Begun. February 2014.
 Publishers Weekly: Review of Vera & Linus. October 2006.
 Reykjavik Grapevine, "A Deep Strong Hope in Its Core" Profiled with Thordis Bjornsdottir following publication of Vera & Linus. Issue 15, 22 September—5 October 2006.
 Frettabladid, "Natturulega skaldleg saelstilling" Interview with Thordis Bjornsdottir following publication of Vera & Linus, 9 September 2006.
 Reykjavik Mag "Elegantly Brutal" Profile with Thordis Bjornsdottir following publication of Vera & Linus, July 2006.
 POETRY DAILY: 3 July 2006, "Missive in an Icelandic Room 3" (From Denver Quarterly)
 POETRY DAILY: 10 November 2005, "Parades," "I Followed A Ribbon" (From Paris Review)
 Fréttabladid: Interview about poetry and about the life of a poet, 27 July 2005.
 Icelandic Radio FM 90.9: Reykjavík, Iceland. Interview by Gunnar Peturrson for upcoming NYHIL festival, July 2005.
 Boston Review: Boston, MA. Review of March Book by Desales Harrison. February/March 2005.
 Book/ Mark: Long Island, NY. Review of March Book by Claire Nicholas-White. 2004.
 The Times, Smithtown, NY; Port Times Record, Port Jefferson, NY. Profile following the publication of March Book''. March 2004.

External links
 jesseball.com (Ball´s website)
 "Pieter Emily", Jesse Ball's novella, serialized in Guernica Magazine
 Nashville Review Interview with Jesse Ball
 Jesse Ball's "THE MERCY OF KINGS"
 "Finding the Comfortable Spots", the Guernica Magazine interview with Jesse Ball by Craig Morgan Teicher
 Grapevine (interview)
 (BOMB interview)

1978 births
Poets from New York (state)
Living people
Vassar College alumni
21st-century American novelists
Columbia University School of the Arts alumni
Novelists from New York (state)
21st-century American poets
People from Port Jefferson, New York
School of the Art Institute of Chicago faculty
American male novelists
American male poets
Berlin Prize recipients
American people of Irish descent
American poets of Italian descent
21st-century American male writers